Qian Xuantong (1887—January 17, 1939) was a Chinese linguist and writer. He was a professor of literature at National Peking University, and along with Gu Jiegang, one of the leaders of the Doubting Antiquity School.

Biography
Born in Huzhou, Zhejiang, Qian was named Qian Xia at birth and was given the courtesy name Deqian (德潜). Qian trained in traditional Chinese philology. After receiving his university education in Japan, Qian held a number of teaching positions in mainland China. He was a student of Zhang Binglin; some of Zhang's works were copied and printed in Qian's remarkable seal script handwriting. As a philologist, Qian was the first to reconstruct the vowel system of Old Chinese in IPA.

A close friend of Lu Xun, Qian was a key figure in the May Fourth Movement and the New Culture Movement. Despite his close relationship with the Chinese classics, he promoted the abolition of classical Chinese. He was also a strong supporter of Esperanto, at one time even proposed the substitution of Chinese by it. An open letter he wrote in response to an anti-Confucian essay of Chen Duxiu stated:

Chen thought that abolishing written Chinese would destroy the spoken language as well and countered Qian's proposal by suggesting that Chinese could use a Roman alphabet.

He and Liu Bannong did their best to promote vernacular Chinese, attacking such classical Chinese stylists as Lin Shu. His skepticism of the Chinese heritage was such that he at one time wanted to change his surname to Yigu (疑古 "suspecting things ancient"). He also did much important work with regards to the standardization of Simplified Chinese characters, Mandarin, and the design of pinyin.

His son Qian Sanqiang was a nuclear physicist who instrumental in the contribution and development of nuclear weapons in China. He was also referred to as China's "father of the atomic bomb".

References

Sources
He Jiuying 何九盈 (1995). Zhongguo xiandai yuyanxue shi (中囯现代语言学史 "A history of modern Chinese linguistics"). Guangzhou: Guangdong jiaoyu chubanshe.
Wu Rui 吳銳 (1996). Qian Xuantong pingzhuan (钱玄同评传 "A Biography of Qian Xuantong"). Nanchang: Baihuazhou wenyi chubanshe.

External links

1887 births
1939 deaths
Academic staff of Beijing Normal University
Chinese Esperantists
Educators from Huzhou
Linguists from China
Academic staff of Peking University
Phoneticians
Scientists from Huzhou
Writers from Huzhou
20th-century linguists